Maryland held its elections October 3, 1814.

See also 
 United States House of Representatives elections, 1814 and 1815
 List of United States representatives from Maryland

Notes 

1814
Maryland
United States House of Representatives